Norman Ravitch is a professor emeritus of history at University of California, Riverside.  He has written books, as well as occasional pieces for the Rockwell Foundation and other libertarian think-tanks.

References

Living people
American libertarians
University of California, Riverside faculty
1936 births
21st-century American historians
21st-century American male writers
American male non-fiction writers